Penicillium abidjanum is a fungus species of the genus Penicillium. Its teleomorph is Eupenicillium abidjanum

See also
List of Penicillium species

References

Further reading

 

abidjanum
Fungi described in 1968